Long Lake is the name of some unincorporated communities in the U.S. state of Michigan:

 Long Lake, Grand Traverse County, Michigan
 Long Lake, Iosco County, Michigan

See also
Long Lake (Michigan),  for lakes of the same name
Long Lake Township, Michigan, a township in Grand Traverse County.

Michigan township disambiguation pages